David Gordon Lyon (24 May 1852 – 4 December 1935) was an American theologian.

He was born in Benton, Alabama, the son of a doctor. In 1875 he received his AB from Howard College in Marion Alabama. (Howard is now Samford University and located in Birmingham, Alabama).. He studied at the Southern Baptist Theological Seminary under Crawford Howell Toy, and went to Germany, where he married Tosca Woehler (d. 1904) and received his PhD from the University of Leipzig in 1882, in the study of Syriac.

He occupied the Hollis Chair at Harvard Divinity School from 1882 to 1910, when he assumed the Hancock professorship of Hebrew and other Oriental languages. Six years after Tosca Woehler's death (1904) he married Mabel E. Harris (d. 1931). He was the founding curator of the Semitic Museum. He retired from Harvard in 1921.

David Gordon Lyon kept a diary for over 30 years of his life. All of the diaries are now digitized and soon will be transcribed into a human and machine-readable form. A goldmine of information about his times, the history of Harvard University and the field of Assyriology.

References

1852 births
1922 deaths
People from Benton, Alabama
Harvard Divinity School faculty
Samford University alumni
Southern Baptist Theological Seminary alumni
Leipzig University alumni